Spice 1 is the self-titled debut album by American rapper Spice 1, released April 14, 1992 on Jive Records. It was certified gold by the RIAA. The album was produced by Ant Banks, Blackjack, E-A-Ski & CMT and Spice 1. It peaked at number 14 on the Billboard Top R&B/Hip-Hop Albums and at number 82 on the Billboard Top Heatseekers. One single, "Welcome to the Ghetto", peaked at number 39 on the Billboard Hot R&B/Hip-Hop Songs and at number 5 on the Billboard Rap Songs.

Along with singles, music videos were produced for four songs: "In My Neighborhood", "Welcome to the Ghetto", "187 Proof" and "East Bay Gangsta". Richie Rich makes a cameo appearance in "Welcome to the Ghetto". "East Bay Gangsta" and "Welcome to the Ghetto" were B-sides on the other singles. The album was included in the Source Magazine's 100 greatest hip hop albums.

Critical reception 
AllMusic - "...His style, an appropriate mix of irony, disdain, acceptance and confusion, never succumbs to the situation or seeks to justify or downplay the sense of impending doom."

Entertainment Weekly (7/24/92, p. 60) - "...Spice 1's lyrics are clever enough to make you forget you've heard it all before...his tales unfold with the drama of short stories..."

iTunes Store - "...with a large serving of gunplay and ghetto storytelling. Spice's unique vocal style showcased an uncanny ability to twist and contort his flow...the bass-heavy beats still knock with authority, ideal for bumping in the scraper..."

Track listing

Samples
Welcome to the Ghetto
"Inner City Blues (Make Me Wanna Holler)" by Marvin Gaye
"No One's Gonna Love You" by The S.O.S. Band
187 Pure
"Take Me to the Mardi Gras" by Bob James
City Streets
"Whatcha See Is Whatcha Get" by The Dramatics
F***ed in the Game
"Make Me Believe in You" by Curtis Mayfield
In My Neighborhood
"Reach for It" by George Duke
Money Gone
"Time for a Change" by Mel Brown
Money or Murder
"Joy by Isaac Hayes
Peace to My Nine
"One Nation Under a Groove" by Funkadelic
Young N****
"Mothership Connection (Star Child)" by Parliament
"Us" by Ice Cube

Note: The sample credits contain a disclaimer from George Clinton disparaging the lyrical content of the song, yet stating the sample was allowed due to the message of music as a free agent of change inherent in "Mothership Connection." This type of note was uncommon for most artists who were sampling.

Charts

Weekly charts

Year-end charts 

RIAA Certification

References

External links 
[ Spice 1] at Allmusic
Spice 1 at Discogs
Spice 1 at MusicBrainz
Spice 1 at Tower Records

Spice 1 albums
1992 debut albums
Albums produced by Ant Banks
Albums produced by E-A-Ski
Jive Records albums